Toronto Star Building can refer to:
Old Toronto Star Building
One Yonge Street